Uinskoye is a rural locality (a selo) and the administrative center of Uinsky District in Perm Krai, Russia. Population:

References

Rural localities in Perm Krai
Osinsky Uyezd